A sailing ship is a sea-going vessel that uses sails mounted on masts to harness the power of wind and propel the vessel. There is a variety of sail plans that propel sailing ships, employing square-rigged or fore-and-aft sails. Some ships carry square sails on each mast—the brig and full-rigged ship, said to be "ship-rigged" when there are three or more masts. Others carry only fore-and-aft sails on each mast, for instance some schooners. Still others employ a combination of square and fore-and-aft sails, including the barque, barquentine, and brigantine.

Early sailing ships were used for river and coastal waters in Ancient Egypt and the Mediterranean. The Austronesian peoples developed maritime technologies that included the fore-and-aft crab-claw sail and with catamaran and outrigger hull configurations, which enabled the Austronesian expansion into the islands of the Indo-Pacific. This expansion originated in Taiwan  BC and propagated through Island Southeast Asia, reaching Near Oceania  BC, Hawaii  AD, and New Zealand  AD. The maritime trading network in the Indo-Pacific dates from at least 1500 BC. Later developments in Asia produced the junk and dhow—vessels that incorporated features unknown in Europe at the time.

European sailing ships with predominantly square rigs became prevalent during the Age of Discovery (15th to 17th centuries), when they crossed oceans between continents and around the world. In the European Age of Sail, a full-rigged ship was one with a bowsprit and three masts, each of which consists of a lower, top, and topgallant mast. Most sailing ships were merchantmen, but the Age of Sail also saw the development of large fleets of well-armed warships. The many steps of technological development of steamships during the 19th century provided slowly increasing competition for sailing ships — initially only on short routes where high prices could be charged. By the 1880s, ships with triple-expansion steam engines had the fuel efficiency to compete with sail on all major routes — and with scheduled sailings that were not affected by the wind direction. However, commercial sailing vessels could still be found working into the 20th century, although in reducing numbers and only in certain trades.

History 

By the time of the Age of Discovery—starting in the 15th century—square-rigged, multi-masted vessels were the norm and were guided by navigation techniques that included the magnetic compass and making sightings of the sun and stars that allowed transoceanic voyages. The Age of Sail reached its peak in the 18th and 19th centuries with large, heavily armed battleships and merchant sailing ships.

Sailing and steam ships coexisted for much of the 19th century. The steamers of the early part of the century had very poor fuel efficiency and were suitable only for a small number of roles, such as towing sailing ships and providing short route passenger and mail services. Both sailing and steam ships saw large technological improvements over the century. Ultimately the two large stepwise improvements in fuel efficiency of compound and then triple-expansion steam engines made the steamship, by the 1880s, able to compete in the vast majority of trades.

Before 1700 
Initially sails provided supplementary power to ships with oars, because the sails were not designed to sail to windward. In the Austronesian Indo-Pacific, sailing ships were equipped with fore-and-aft rigs that made sailing to windward possible. Later square-rigged vessels too were able to sail to windward, and became the standard for European ships through the Age of Discovery when vessels ventured around Africa to India, to the Americas and around the world. Later during this period—in the late 15th century—"ship-rigged" vessels with multiple square sails on each mast appeared and became common for sailing ships.

South China Sea & Austronesia 

Early sea-going sailing vessels were used by the Austronesian peoples. Their invention of catamarans, outriggers, and crab claw sails enabled the Austronesian Expansion at around 3000 to 1500 BC. From Taiwan, they rapidly colonized the islands of Maritime Southeast Asia, then sailed further onwards to Micronesia, Island Melanesia, Polynesia, and Madagascar. Austronesian rigs were distinctive in that they had spars supporting both the upper and lower edges of the sails (and sometimes in between), in contrast to western rigs which only had a spar on the upper edge.

Early Austronesian sailors also influenced the development of sailing technologies in Sri Lanka and Southern India through the Austronesian maritime trade network of the Indian Ocean, the precursor to the spice trade route and the maritime silk road.
Austronesians established the first maritime trade network with ocean-going merchant ships which plied the early trade routes from Southeast Asia from at least 1500 BC. They reached as far northeast as Japan and as far west as eastern Africa. They colonized Madagascar and their trade routes were the precursors to the spice trade route and the maritime silk road. They mainly facilitated trade of goods from China and Japan to South India, Sri Lanka, the Persian Gulf, and the Red Sea. Balance lugsails and tanja sails originated from this region. Vessels with such sails explored and traded along the western coast of Africa. This type of sail propagated to the west and influenced Arab lateen designs.

Large Austronesian trading ships with as many as four sails were recorded by Han Dynasty (206 BC – 220 AD) scholars as the kunlun bo or K'un-lun po (崑崙舶, lit. "ship of the Kunlun people"). They were booked by Chinese Buddhist pilgrims for passage to Southern India and Sri Lanka. Bas reliefs of large Javanese outriggers ships with various configurations of tanja sails are also found in the Borobudur temple, dating back to the 8th century CE.

By the 10th century AD, the Song Dynasty started building the first Chinese seafaring junks, which adopted several features of the K'un-lun po. The junk rig in particular, became associated with Chinese coast-hugging trading ships. Junks in China were constructed from teak with pegs and nails; they featured watertight compartments and acquired center-mounted tillers and rudders. These ships became the basis for the development of Chinese warships during the Mongol Yuan Dynasty, and were used in the unsuccessful Mongol invasions of Japan and Java.

The Ming dynasty (1368–1644) saw the use of junks as long-distance trading vessels. Chinese Admiral Zheng He reportedly sailed to India, Arabia, and southern Africa on a trade and diplomatic mission.

Mediterranean and Baltic 

Sailing ships in the Mediterranean region date back to at least 3000 BC, when Egyptians used a bipod mast to support a single square sail on a vessel that mainly relied on multiple paddlers. Later the mast became a single pole, and paddles were supplanted with oars. Such vessels plied both the Nile and the Mediterranean coast. The Minoan civilization of Crete may have been the world's first thalassocracy brought to prominence by sailing vessels dating to before 1800 BC (Middle Minoan IIB). Between 1000 BC and 400 AD, the Phoenicians, Greeks and Romans developed ships that were powered by square sails, sometimes with oars to supplement their capabilities. Such vessels used a steering oar as a rudder to control direction. 

Starting in the 8th century in Denmark, Vikings were building clinker-constructed longships propelled by a single, square sail, when practical, and oars, when necessary. A related craft was the knarr, which plied the Baltic and North Seas, using primarily sail power. The windward edge of the sail was stiffened with a beitass, a pole that fitted into the lower corner of the sail, when sailing close to the wind.

Indian Ocean 

India's maritime history began during the 3rd millennium BCE when inhabitants of the Indus Valley initiated maritime trading contact with Mesopotamia. Indian kingdoms such as the Kalinga from as early as 2nd century CE are believed to have had sailing ships. One of the earliest instances of documented evidence of Indian sailing ship building comes from the mural of three-masted ship in the Ajanta caves that date back to 400-500 CE.

The Indian Ocean was the venue for increasing trade between India and Africa between 1200 and 1500. The vessels employed would be classified as dhows with lateen rigs. During this interval such vessels grew in capacity from 100 to 400 tonnes. Dhows were often built with teak planks from India and Southeast Asia, sewn together with coconut husk fiber—no nails were employed. This period also saw the implementation of center-mounted rudders, controlled with a tiller.

Global exploration

Technological advancements that were important to the Age of Discovery in the 15th century were the adoption of the magnetic compass and advances in ship design.

The compass was an addition to the ancient method of navigation based on sightings of the sun and stars. The compass was invented by Chinese. It had been used for navigation in China by the 11th century and was adopted by the Arab traders in the Indian Ocean. The compass spread to Europe by the late 12th or early 13th century. Use of the compass for navigation in the Indian Ocean was first mentioned in 1232. The Europeans used a "dry" compass, with a needle on a pivot. The compass card was also a European invention.

At the beginning of the 15th century, the carrack was the most capable European ocean-going ship. It was carvel-built and large enough to be stable in heavy seas. It was capable of carrying a large cargo and the provisions needed for very long voyages. Later carracks were square-rigged on the foremast and mainmast and lateen-rigged on the mizzenmast. They had a high rounded stern with large aftcastle, forecastle and bowsprit at the stem. As the predecessor of the galleon, the carrack was one of the most influential ship designs in history; while ships became more specialized in the following centuries, the basic design remained unchanged throughout this period.

Ships of this era were only able to sail approximately 70° into the wind and tacked from one side to the other across the wind with difficulty, which made it challenging to avoid shipwrecks when near shores or shoals during storms. Nonetheless, such vessels reached India around Africa with Vasco da Gama, the Americas with Christopher Columbus, and around the world under Ferdinand Magellan.

1700 to 1850 

Sailing ships became longer and faster over time, with ship-rigged vessels carrying taller masts with more square sails. Other sail plans emerged, as well, that had just fore-and-aft sails (schooners), or a mixture of the two (brigantines, barques and barquentines).

Warships 

Cannons were introduced in the 14th century, but did not become common at sea until they could be reloaded quickly enough to be reused in the same battle. The size of a ship required to carry a large number of cannon made oar-based propulsion impossible, and warships came to rely primarily on sails. The sailing man-of-war emerged during the 16th century.

By the middle of the 17th century, warships were carrying increasing numbers of cannon on three decks. Naval tactics evolved to bring each ship's firepower to bear in a line of battle—coordinated movements of a fleet of warships to engage a line of ships in the enemy fleet. Carracks with a single cannon deck evolved into galleons with as many as two full cannon decks, which evolved into the man-of-war, and further into the ship of the line—designed for engaging the enemy in a line of battle. One side of a ship was expected to shoot broadsides against an enemy ship at close range. In the 18th century, the small and fast frigate and sloop-of-war—too small to stand in the line of battle—evolved to convoy trade, scout for enemy ships and blockade enemy coasts.

Clippers 

The term "clipper" started to be used in the first quarter of the 19th century. It was applied to sailing vessels designed primarily for speed. Only a small proportion of sailing vessels could properly have the term applied to them.

Early examples were the schooners and brigantines, called Baltimore clippers, used for blockade running or as privateers in the War of 1812 and afterwards for smuggling opium or illegally transporting slaves. Larger clippers, usually ship or barque rigged and with a different hull design, were built for the California trade (from east coast USA ports to San Francisco) after gold was discovered in 1848  the associated ship-building boom lasted until 1854.

Clippers were built for trade between the United Kingdom and China after the East India Company lost its monopoly in 1834. The primary cargo was tea, and sailing ships, particularly tea clippers, dominated this long distance route until the development of fuel efficient steamships coincided with the opening of the Suez Canal in 1869.

Other clippers worked on the Australian immigrant routes or, in smaller quantities, in any role where a fast passage secured higher rates of freight or passenger fares. Whilst many clippers were ship rigged, the definition is not limited to any rig.

Clippers were generally built for a specific trade: those in the California trade had to withstand the seas of Cape Horn, whilst Tea Clippers were designed for the lighter and contrary winds of the China Sea. All had fine lines, with a well streamlined hull and carried a large sail area. To get the best of this, a skilled and determined master was needed in command.

Copper sheathing 

During the Age of Sail, ships' hulls were under frequent attack by shipworm (which affected the structural strength of timbers), and barnacles and various marine weeds (which affected ship speed). Since before the common era, a variety of coatings had been applied to hulls to counter this effect, including pitch, wax, tar, oil, sulfur and arsenic. In the mid 18th century copper sheathing was developed as a defense against such bottom fouling. After coping with problems of galvanic deterioration of metal hull fasteners, sacrificial anodes were developed, which were designed to corrode, instead of the hull fasteners. The practice became widespread on naval vessels, starting in the late 18th century, and on merchant vessels, starting in the early 19th century, until the advent of iron and steel hulls.

After 1850 

Iron-hulled sailing ships, often referred to as "windjammers" or "tall ships", represented the final evolution of sailing ships at the end of the Age of Sail. They were built to carry bulk cargo for long distances in the nineteenth and early twentieth centuries. They were the largest of merchant sailing ships, with three to five masts and square sails, as well as other sail plans. They carried lumber, guano, grain or ore between continents. Later examples had steel hulls. Iron-hulled sailing ships were mainly built from the 1870s to 1900, when steamships began to outpace them economically, due to their ability to keep a schedule regardless of the wind. Steel hulls also replaced iron hulls at around the same time. Even into the twentieth century, sailing ships could hold their own on transoceanic voyages such as Australia to Europe, since they did not require bunkerage for coal nor fresh water for steam, and they were faster than the early steamers, which usually could barely make .

The four-masted, iron-hulled ship, introduced in 1875 with the full-rigged , represented an especially efficient configuration that prolonged the competitiveness of sail against steam in the later part of the 19th century. The largest example of such ships was the five-masted, full-rigged ship , which had a load capacity of 7,800 tonnes. Ships transitioned from all sail to all steam-power from the mid 19th century into the 20th. Five-masted Preussen used steam power for driving the winches, hoists and pumps, and could be manned by a crew of 48, compared with four-masted Kruzenshtern, which has a crew of 257.

Coastal top-sail schooners with a crew as small as two managing the sail handling became an efficient way to carry bulk cargo, since only the fore-sails required tending while tacking and steam-driven machinery was often available for raising the sails and the anchor.

In the 20th century, the DynaRig allowed central, automated control of all sails in a manner that obviates the need for sending crew aloft. This was developed in the 1960s in Germany as a low-carbon footprint propulsion alternative for commercial ships. The rig automatically sets and reefs sails; its mast rotates to align the sails with the wind. The sailing yachts Maltese Falcon and Black Pearl employ the rig.

Features
Every sailing ship has a sail plan that is adapted to the purpose of the vessel and the ability of the crew; each has a hull, rigging and masts to hold up the sails that use the wind to power the ship; the masts are supported by standing rigging and the sails are adjusted by running rigging.

Hull 

Hull shapes for sailing ships evolved from being relatively short and blunt to being longer and finer at the bow. By the nineteenth century, ships were built with reference to a half model, made from wooden layers that were pinned together. Each layer could be scaled to the actual size of the vessel in order to lay out its hull structure, starting with the keel and leading to the ship's ribs. The ribs were pieced together from curved elements, called futtocks and tied in place until the installation of the planking. Typically, planking was caulked with a tar-impregnated yarn made from manila or hemp to make the planking watertight. Starting in the mid-19th century, iron was used first for the hull structure and later for its watertight sheathing.

Masts 

Until the mid-19th century all vessels' masts were made of wood formed from a single or several pieces of timber which typically consisted of the trunk of a conifer tree. From the 16th century, vessels were often built of a size requiring masts taller and thicker than could be made from single tree trunks. On these larger vessels, to achieve the required height, the masts were built from up to four sections (also called masts), known in order of rising height above the decks as the lower, top, topgallant and royal masts. Giving the lower sections sufficient thickness necessitated building them up from separate pieces of wood. Such a section was known as a made mast, as opposed to sections formed from single pieces of timber, which were known as pole masts. Starting in the second half of the 19th century, masts were made of iron or steel.

For ships with square sails the principal masts, given their standard names in bow to stern (front to back) order, are:

 Fore-mast — the mast nearest the bow, or the mast forward of the main-mast with sections: fore-mast lower, fore topmast, and fore topgallant mast
 Main-mast — the tallest mast, usually located near the center of the ship with sections: main-mast lower, main topmast, main topgallant mast, royal mast (sometimes)
 Mizzen-mast — the aft-most mast. Typically shorter than the fore-mast with sections: mizzen-mast lower, mizzen topmast, and mizzen topgallant mast.

Sails 

Each rig is configured in a sail plan, appropriate to the size of the sailing craft. Both square-rigged and fore-and-aft rigged vessels have been built with a wide range of configurations for single and multiple masts.

Types of sail that can be part of a sail plan can be broadly classed by how they are attached to the sailing craft:

 To a stay — Sails attached to stays, include jibs, which are attached to forestays and staysails, which are mounted on other stays (typically wire cable) that support other masts from the bow aft.
 To a mast — Fore-and-aft sails directly attached to the mast at the luff include gaff-rigged quadrilateral and Bermuda triangular sails.
 To a spar — Sails attached to a spar include both square sails and such fore-and-aft quadrilateral sails as lug rigs, junk and spritsails and such triangular sails as the lateen, and the crab claw.

Rigging 

Sailing ships have standing rigging to support the masts and running rigging to raise the sails and control their ability to draw power from the wind. The running rigging has three main roles, to support the sail structure, to shape the sail and to adjust its angle to the wind. Square-rigged vessels require more controlling lines than fore-and-aft rigged ones.

Standing rigging 
Sailing ships prior to the mid-19th century used wood masts with hemp-fiber standing rigging. As rigs became taller by the end of the 19th century, masts relied more heavily on successive spars, stepped one atop the other to form the whole, from bottom to top: the lower mast, top mast, and topgallant mast. This construction relied heavily on support by a complex array of stays and shrouds. Each stay in either the fore-and-aft or athwartships direction had a corresponding one in the opposite direction providing counter-tension. Fore-and-aft the system of tensioning started with the stays that were anchored in front each mast. Shrouds were tensioned by pairs deadeyes, circular blocks that had the large-diameter line run around them, whilst multiple holes allowed smaller line—lanyard—to pass multiple times between the two and thereby allow tensioning of the shroud. After the mid-19th century square-rigged vessels were equipped with iron wire standing rigging, which was superseded with steel wire in the late 19th century.

Running rigging 
Halyards, used to raise and lower the yards, are the primary supporting lines. In addition, square rigs have lines that lift the sail or the yard from which it is suspended that include: brails, buntlines, lifts and leechlines. Bowlines and clew lines shape a square sail. To adjust the angle of the sail to wind braces are used to adjust the fore and aft angle of a yard of a square sail, while sheets attach to the clews (bottom corners) of a sail to control the sail's angle to the wind. Sheets run aft, whereas tacks are used to haul the clew of a square sail forward.

Crew 

The crew of a sailing ship is divided between officers (the captain and his subordinates) and seamen or ordinary hands. An able seaman was expected to "hand, reef, and steer" (handle the lines and other equipment, reef the sails, and steer the vessel). The crew is organized to stand watch—the oversight of the ship for a period—typically four hours each. Richard Henry Dana Jr. and Herman Melville each had personal experience aboard sailing vessels of the 19th century.

Merchant vessel
Dana described the crew of the merchant brig, Pilgrim, as comprising six to eight common sailors, four specialist crew members (the steward, cook, carpenter and sailmaker), and three officers: the captain, the first mate and the second mate. He contrasted the American crew complement with that of other nations on whose similarly sized ships the crew might number as many as 30. Larger merchant vessels had larger crews.

Warship
Melville described the crew complement of the frigate warship, United States, as about 500—including officers, enlisted personnel and 50 Marines. The crew was divided into the starboard and larboard watches. It was also divided into three tops, bands of crew responsible for setting sails on the three masts; a band of sheet-anchor men, whose station was forward and whose job was to tend the fore-yard, anchors and forward sails; the after guard, who were stationed aft and tended the mainsail, spanker and man the various sheets, controlling the position of the sails; the waisters, who were stationed midships and had menial duties attending the livestock, etc.; and the holders, who occupied the lower decks of the vessel and were responsible for the inner workings of the ship. He additionally named such positions as, boatswains, gunners, carpenters, coopers, painters, tinkers, stewards, cooks and various boys as functions on the man-of-war. 18-19th century ships of the line had a complement as high as 850.

Ship handling 

Handling a sailing ship requires management of its sails to power—but not overpower—the ship and navigation to guide the ship, both at sea and in and out of harbors.

Under sail
Key elements of sailing a ship are setting the right amount of sail to generate maximum power without endangering the ship, adjusting the sails to the wind direction on the course sailed, and changing tack to bring the wind from one side of the vessel to the other.

Setting sail 
A sailing ship crew manages the running rigging of each square sail. Each sail has two sheets that control its lower corners, two braces that control the angle of the yard, two clewlines, four buntlines and two reef tackles. All these lines must be manned as the sail is deployed and the yard raised. They use a halyard to raise each yard and its sail; then they pull or ease the braces to set the angle of the yard across the vessel; they pull on sheets to haul lower corners of the sail, clews, out to yard below. Under way, the crew manages reef tackles, haul leeches, reef points, to manage the size and angle of the sail; bowlines pull the leading edge of the sail (leech) taut when close hauled. When furling the sail, the crew uses clewlines, haul up the clews and buntlines to haul up the middle of sail up; when lowered, lifts support each yard.

In strong winds, the crew is directed to reduce the number of sails or, alternatively, the amount of each given sail that is presented to the wind by a process called reefing. To pull the sail up, seamen on the yardarm pull on reef tackles, attached to reef cringles, to pull the sail up and secure it with lines, called reef points. Dana spoke of the hardships of sail handling during high wind and rain or with ice covering the ship and its rigging.

Changing tack 

Sailing vessels cannot sail directly into the wind. Instead, square-riggers must sail a course that is between 60° and 70° away from the wind direction and fore-and aft vessels can typically sail no closer than 45°. To reach a destination, sailing vessels may have to change course and allow the wind to come from the opposite side in a procedure, called tacking, when the wind comes across the bow during the maneuver.

When tacking, a square-rigged vessel's sails must be presented squarely to the wind and thus impede forward motion as they are swung around via the yardarms through the wind as controlled by the vessel's running rigging, using braces—adjusting the fore and aft angle of each yardarm around the mast—and sheets attached to the clews (bottom corners) of each sail to control the sail's angle to the wind. The procedure is to turn the vessel into the wind with the hind-most fore-and-aft sail (the spanker), pulled to windward to help turn the ship through the eye of the wind. Once the ship has come about, all the sails are adjusted to align properly with the new tack. Because square-rigger masts are more strongly braced from behind than from ahead, tacking is a dangerous procedure in strong winds; the ship may lose forward momentum (become caught in stays) and the rigging may fail from the wind coming from ahead. Under these conditions, the choice may be to wear ship—to turn the ship away from the wind and around 240° onto the next tack (60° off the wind).

A fore-and-aft rig permits the wind to flow past the sail, as the craft head through the eye of the wind. Most rigs pivot around a stay or the mast, while this occurs. For a jib, the old leeward sheet is released as the craft heads through the wind and the old windward sheet is tightened as the new leeward sheet to allow the sail to draw wind. Mainsails are often self-tending and slide on a traveler to the opposite side. On certain rigs, such as lateens and luggers, the sail may be partially lowered to bring it to the opposite side.

Navigation 

Early navigational techniques employed observations of the sun, stars, waves and birdlife. In the 15th century, the Chinese were using the magnetic compass to identify direction of travel. By the 16th century in Europe, navigational instruments included the quadrant, the astrolabe, cross staff, dividers and compass. By the time of the Age of Exploration these tools were being used in combination with a log to measure speed, a lead line to measure soundings, and a lookout to identify potential hazards. Later, an accurate marine sextant became standard for determining latitude and was used with an accurate chronometer to calculate longitude.

Passage planning begins with laying out a route along a chart, which comprises a series of courses between fixes—verifiable locations that confirm the actual track of the ship on the ocean. Once a course has been set, the person at the helm attempts to follow its direction with reference to the compass. The navigator notes the time and speed at each fix to estimate the arrival at the next fix, a process called dead reckoning. For coast-wise navigation, sightings from known landmarks or navigational aids may be used to establish fixes, a process called pilotage. At sea, sailing ships used celestial navigation on a daily schedule, as follows:
 Continuous dead reckoning plot
 Star observations at morning twilight for a celestial fix
 Morning sun observation to determine compass error by azimuth observation of the sun
 Noontime observation of the sun for noon latitude line for determination the day's run and day's set and drift
 Afternoon sun line to determine compass error by azimuth observation of the sun
 Star observations at evening twilight for a celestial fix
Fixes were taken with a marine sextant, which measures the distance of the celestial body above the horizon.

Entering and leaving harbor 
Given the limited maneuverability of sailing ships, it could be difficult to enter and leave harbor with the presence of a tide without coordinating arrivals with a flooding tide and departures with an ebbing tide. In harbor, a sailing ship stood at anchor, unless it needed to be loaded or unloaded at a dock or pier, in which case it might be warped alongside or towed by a tug. Warping involved using a long rope (the warp) between the ship and a fixed point on the shore. This was pulled on by a capstan on shore, or on the ship. This might be a multi-stage process if the route was not simple. If no fixed point was available, a kedge anchor might be taken out in a ship's boat to a suitable point and the ship then pulled up to the kedge. Square rigged vessels could use backing and filling (of the sails) to manoeuvre in a tideway, or control could be maintained by drudging the anchor - lower the anchor until it touches the bottom so that the dragging anchor gives steerage way in the flow of the tide.

Examples

These are examples of sailing ships; some terms have multiple meanings:

Defined by general configuration
 Caravel: small maneuverable ship, lateen rigged
 Carrack: three or four masted ship, square-rigged forward, lateen-rigged aft
 Clipper: a merchant ship designed specifically for speed
 Cog: plank-built, one-masted, square-rigged vessel
 Dhow: a lateen-rigged merchant or fishing vessel
 Djong: large tradeship used by ancient Indonesian and Malaysian people
 Fluyt: a Dutch oceangoing merchant vessel, rigged similarly to a galleon 
 Galleon: a large, primarily square-rigged, armed cargo carrier of the sixteenth and seventeenth centuries
 Junk: a lug-rigged Chinese ship, which included many types, models and variants. 
 Koch: small, Russian clinker-built ship, designed for use in Arctic waters
 Longship: vessels used by the Vikings, with a single mast and square sail, also propelled by oars.
 Pinisi: Indonesia's traditional sailing ship
 Pink: in the Atlantic, a small oceangoing ship with a narrow stern.
 Snow: a brig carrying a square mainsail and often a spanker on a trysail mast
 Sailing superyacht: a large sailing yacht
 Waʻa kaulua: Polynesian double-hulled voyaging canoe
 Windjammer: (informal) large merchant sailing ship with an iron or steel hull

Defined by sail plan

All masts have fore-and-aft sails
 Schooner: fore-and-aft rigged sails, with two or more masts, the aftermost mast taller or equal to the height of the forward 
All masts have square sails
 Brig: two masts, square rigged (may have a spanker on the aftermost)
 Full-rigged ship: three or more masts, all of them square rigged
Mixture of masts with square sails and masts with fore-and-aft sails
 Barque, or "bark": at least three masts, fore-and-aft rigged mizzen mast
 Barquentine: at least three masts with all but the foremost fore-and-aft rigged
 Bilander: a ship or brig with a lug-rigged mizzen sail
 Brigantine: two masts, with the foremast square-rigged
 Hermaphrodite brig: a brigantine
Military vessels
 Corvette: lightly armed, fast sailing vessel
 Cutter: small naval vessel, fore-and-aft rigged, single mast with two headsails
 Frigate: a ship-rigged warship with a single gundeck 
 Ship of the line: the largest warship in European navies, ship-rigged
 Xebec: a Mediterranean warship adapted from a galley, with three lateen-rigged masts

See also

 List of large sailing vessels
 Sailboat
 Sailing ship accidents
 Sailing ship effect—describing the transition between an old and new technology
 Sailing ship tactics
 Shipbuilding
 Tall ship

Notes

References

Further reading
 Graham, Gerald S. "The Ascendancy of the Sailing Ship 1850–85".Economic History Review, 9#1 1956, pp. 74–88 online

External links